Jiangjun is the Chinese name for a general officer. It can also refer to the following places:

 Jiangjun District, district in Tainan, Taiwan
 Jiangjun Mountain, mountain in Jiangsu Province, China